Martin Stone (11 December 1946, Woking, Surrey –  9 November 2016, Versailles, France) was an English guitarist and rare book dealer. He was a longtime resident of Fingest in Buckinghamshire and, latterly, Paris.

Musical career
Stone was a few years younger than his later musical partner Michael Moorcock but grew up in the same part of South London, knew the same book- and music-shops and had the same enthusiasms. The first time both met was on stage when Stone was in Mighty Baby and Moorcock was with Hawkwind. His last album, which he called his legacy album is LIVE FROM THE TERMINAL CAFE with Michael Moorcock and the Deep Fix (Cleopatra Records, Autumn 2019).   Educated at Whitgift School, he initially wanted to be a journalist and began as a cub reporter on The Croydon Advertiser, interviewing Jimmy Page when he was still a session musician. Stone's passion for the guitar led him to become a musician. He was given consideration as a possible replacement for Brian Jones in the Rolling Stones.

Stone played in many groups, including Junior's Blues Band, Stone's Masonry, Almost Presley, The Action, Savoy Brown Blues Band, Mighty Baby, Chilli Willi and the Red Hot Peppers, Les Soucoupes violentes, Southern Comfort, Pink Fairies, The 101ers, Wreckless Eric, and the Gibson Girls. Martin also played live with French chanteuse Anne Pigalle for a couple of years including Glastonbury in 2005 for a second time.

He continued to play, backing Marianne Faithfull in her live performances, lead guitar in the French band Almost Presley and others.

Book runner
By the 1980s, Stone was earning much of his living as a bookseller, with an almost uncanny knack for finding 'lost' or famous books. He was a great fan of the writer M. P. Shiel, who first inspired his passion for book collecting and later book-selling, achieving an international reputation as a bookrunner. His personal collection of 19th-20th century French poetry was acquired in 2019 by Cambridge University Library. He was a major player in John Baxter's memoir A Pound of Paper: Confessions of a Book Addict. He was the subject of a limited edition photographic book Martin Stone, Bookscout by the California rare bookseller Peter Howard of Serendipity Books. He  appeared in the television documentary Without Walls: The Cardinal And The Corpse (Iain Sinclair / Chris Petit 1992). He was also known to be the basis for the character Nicholas Lane in Sinclair's novel White Chappell, Scarlett Tracings (1987).

Personal life
Stone was married in 1980 to Ruth Bullock and their daughter is the actress Sophie Leigh Stone.

References

External links
Daily Telegraph obituary
Times Obituary 6 December 2016 (Reg. reqd.) | print
 Stone's cameo appearance as himself in the 1992 tv film The Cardinal & The Corpse
Mighty Baby 1995 Martin Stone interview (Ptolemaic Terrascope 1995)
The Legend of Martin Stone, Bookscout extraordinaire.(Bookride 2007)
 CBS TV Sunday Morning segment includes Stone (2009)
 Paris sans Martin Stone, sans arcades, mais avec le marché et les amateurs de certains  Radio program featuring Stone in 2012 buying books in the Paris markets (Resonance FM 15 November 2016)
 "The new Martin Stone collection of French illustrated poetry, 19th-20th centuries at Cambridge", Cambridge University Library European collections blog (16 May 2019).
Martin Stone's French illustrated books, 1873-1925: sale catalogue by Justin Croft (10/2017)

1946 births
2016 deaths
People from Woking
English rock guitarists
British rhythm and blues boom musicians
Book collecting
Savoy Brown members
Chilli Willi and the Red Hot Peppers members
The Dukes (British band) members
The 101ers members